Uay or UAY may refer to:

 Wayob, Maya word for sleep
 Genetic code for tyrosine